Dave Powers may refer to:

 David Powers (1912–1998), special assistant to John F. Kennedy
 Dave Powers (director) (1933–2008), American television director and producer